Qalehchi-ye Pain (also Romanized as Qal‘ehchī-ye Pā’īn; also known as Qalāchī-ye Soflá and Qal‘ehchī-ye Soflá) is a village in Nahr-e Mian Rural District, Zalian District, Shazand County, Markazi Province, Iran. At the 2006 census, its population was 166, in 45 families.

References 

Populated places in Shazand County